HMS Diamond was a  destroyer of the British Royal Navy. She was built by John Brown & Company in Clydebank, Scotland, and launched on 14 June 1950. This ship was John Brown & Company's first all-welded ship (as opposed to the rivetted construction more commonly used up to that time).

Service history
In 1953 Diamond took part in the Fleet Review to celebrate the Coronation of Queen Elizabeth II.  On 29 September 1953, she sustained severe bow damage in a collision with the cruiser   during Exercise Mariner, held off the coast of Iceland.

In 1956 Diamond was sent into Port Said to show the flag prior to the Franco-British assault, but the Egyptian government was unmoved and she sailed out to join the main attack force for the Suez landings at Port Said. She underwent a refit in 1959 at Chatham Dockyard. In 1964 she was involved in another collision, this time with the frigate , in the English Channel during a naval demonstration.

In 1970, she became one of two Harbour Training Ships moored alongside Priddy's Hard jetty in Gosport and attached to the Marine Engineering School at nearby HMS Sultan and remained in this role until replaced by HMS Londonderry. For most of this time, her steam plant remained maintained and useable for watchkeeping familiarisation purposes. HMS Diamond was scrapped in Rainham in Kent in 1981.

References

Publications
 
 

 

Daring-class destroyers (1949) of the Royal Navy
Ships built on the River Clyde
1950 ships
Cold War destroyers of the United Kingdom